Savatsi may refer to:
Savatsi Aqalar
Savatsi Gol Chub
Savatsi Shiadeh